John Aylworth (by 1516 – 28 December 1575), of Wells, Somerset, Dartington, Devon and Bangor Place, Holborn, London, was an English politician.

Aylworth was probably the second son of Anthony Aylworth of Aylworth, Gloucestershire. Aylworth married Elizabeth Ashton, and they had six sons and one daughter. Two of their sons, Ashton and Edward, became Members of Parliament.

He was a Member (MP) of the Parliament of England for Wells in 1547, 1553, 1558, 1559, 1563, 1571, 1572 and for Penryn in October 1553.

References

1575 deaths
People from Wells, Somerset
People from South Hams (district)
People from Holborn
English MPs 1547–1552
English MPs 1558
English MPs 1559
English MPs 1563–1567
English MPs 1571
English MPs 1572–1583
English MPs 1553 (Mary I)
Year of birth uncertain